Gonzalo Federico González Pereyra (born 7 October 1993) is an Uruguayan professional footballer who plays as a midfielder for Ecuadorian Serie A club Delfín.

Career
González's career began in 2013 with Danubio of the Uruguayan Primera División, making his professional debut on 8 December in a 2–0 win over El Tanque Sisley. This late-season fixture ended up being his only appearance of the 2013–14 campaign, although Danubio finished as league champion. Over the following four seasons, he made 55 more appearances. His lone goal with the club came on the final match-day of the 2017 season, during a 1–0 win against Boston River on 3 December. Incidentally, this was his final appearance with the club, yet his game-winning goal ensured Danubio's place in the 2018 Copa Sudamericana.

In January 2018, González joined Argentine Primera División side Arsenal Sarandí. His first appearance for Arsenal Sarandí came on 4 February versus Gimnasia La Plata, playing the full 90 minutes of a 0–0 draw.

Five months later, he made the move to Apollon Smyrnis, signing a one-year deal with the Athens-based club.

González signed with Ecuadorian Serie A side Delfín in January 2022.

Honours

Club
Danubio
 Uruguayan Primera División: 2013–14

Career statistics
.

References

External links
 
 

 Superleague Greece profile

Living people
1993 births
Uruguayan footballers
Association football midfielders
Danubio F.C. players
Arsenal de Sarandí footballers
Apollon Smyrnis F.C. players
Juventud de Las Piedras players
Albirex Niigata players
Delfín S.C. footballers
Uruguayan Primera División players
Argentine Primera División players
Super League Greece players
J2 League players
Ecuadorian Serie A players
Uruguayan expatriate footballers
Uruguayan expatriate sportspeople in Argentina
Uruguayan expatriate sportspeople in Greece
Uruguayan expatriate sportspeople in Japan
Uruguayan expatriate sportspeople in Ecuador
Expatriate footballers in Argentina
Expatriate footballers in Greece
Expatriate footballers in Japan
Expatriate footballers in Ecuador
People from Rocha, Uruguay